Fabio Menghi (born 19 February 1986) is an Italian motorcycle racer. He competes in the CIV Superbike Championship aboard a Ducati Panigale. His brother, Omar Menghi, is also a motorcycle racer.

Career statistics

Supersport World Championship

Races by year

Superbike World Championship

Races by year

References

External links

Living people
1986 births
Italian motorcycle racers
Supersport World Championship riders
Sportspeople from Rimini
Superbike World Championship riders